Mahmoud Sattari ( born 22 February 1991) is an Iranian Muay Thai kickboxer.  Sattari is currently under contract with the K-1 Organization.

As of June 2022 he was the #9 ranked Light Heavyweight kickboxer in the world by Combat Press.

Biography and career 
Sattari started kickboxing at the age of six. He has won several national championships in the youth category up to adults. Silver medals at the 2014 Asian Beach Games and gold medals the 2017 Asian Indoor and Martial Arts Games are some of his achievements in amateur Muay Thai. Sattari also took part in the 2016 IFMA World Muaythai Championships in Jönköping and the 2017 WAKO World Muaythai Championships in Budapest

Sattari emigrated to Japan in 2020 to participate in professional world leagues. On 17 October 2020, he was able to present himself by defeating Seiya Tanigawa in the Krush organization. On 25 November 2020, he won the M-1 Heavyweight Championship title. On 21 March 2021, he defeated Hisaki Kato in the second round at the Krush organization.

On 24 October 2021, Sattari Won Krush organization World Cruiserweight Title in Grand prix tournament by knocking out Rui Hanazawa and Seiya Tanigawa in the first round. On 26 January 2022, he won the Krush Knockout of the Year 2021 at the K-1 awards.

Sattari faced former DFS Heavyweight Championship challenger Ștefan Lătescu on 3 December 2022 at K-1 World GP 2022 in Osaka.

Achievements

Amateur 
 Asian Beach Games:
  2014 Asian Beach Games - Phuket (-81 kg)
 Asian Indoor and Martial Arts Games:
  2017 Asian Indoor and Martial Arts Games Kickboxing Low Kick (-81 kg)

Professional 
 M-1 Weerasakreck Muay Thai
 2020 M-1 Heavyweight Champion
 Krush
 2021 Krush Cruiserweight (-90 kg) Champion (One successful defense)
 2021 Krush Knockout of the Year (vs Animal Koji)
 K-1
 2022 K-1 World GP Japan Openweight Tournament Winner

Fight record

|- style="background:#fbb;"
| 2022-12-03 || Loss ||align=left| Ștefan Lătescu || K-1 World GP 2022 in Osaka || Osaka, Japan || TKO (Punches) || 2 || 1:37
|- style="background:#cfc"
| 2022-06-19 || Win ||align=left| Yuta Uchida || THE MATCH 2022 || Tokyo, Japan || KO (Left hook) || 1 || 1:19
|- style="background:#cfc"
| 2022-04-03 ||Win ||align=left| Seiya Tanigawa || K-1: K'Festa 5, Openweight Grand Prix Final || Tokyo, Japan || TKO (3 Knockdowns) || 3 || 0:17
|-
! style=background:white colspan=9 |
|- style="background:#cfc"
| 2022-04-03 || Win ||align=left| Kyotaro || K-1: K'Festa 5, Openweight Grand Prix Semi Finals || Tokyo, Japan || Decision (Majority) || 3 ||3:00
|- style="background:#cfc"
| 2022-04-03 || Win ||align=left| K-Jee || K-1: K'Festa 5, Openweight Grand Prix Quarter Finals || Tokyo, Japan || KO (Left hook) || 1 ||1:28
|- style="background:#cfc;"
|2021-12-18
|Win
| align="left" | Animal Koji
|Krush 132
|Tokyo, Japan
|KO (Left Hook)
|1
|0:30
|-
! style=background:white colspan=9 |
|-
|- style="background:#cfc;"
|2021-07-24
|Win
| align="left" | Seiya Tanigawa
|Krush 127
|Tokyo, Japan
|TKO (Right hook)
|1
|2:44
|-
! style=background:white colspan=9 |
|- style="background:#cfc;"
|2021-07-24
|Win
| align="left" | Rui Hanazawa
|Krush 127
|Tokyo, Japan
|TKO (Right hook)
|1
|2:14
|- style="background:#cfc;"
|2021-03-21
|Win
| align="left" | Hisaki Kato
|K'FESTA 4: Day 1
|Tokyo, Japan
|TKO (Knee & Punches)
|2
|0:26
|- style="background:#cfc;"
|2020-11-28
|Win
| align="left" | Kenta Mori
|KODO-THE MOVE
|Tokyo, Japan
|TKO (Three Knockdown Rule)
|1
|1:43
|-
! style=background:white colspan=9 |

|- style="background:#cfc;"
|2020-10-17
|Win
| align="left" | Seiya Tanigawa
|Krush 118
|Tokyo, Japan
|KO (Right hook)
|2
|2:44

|- style="background:#cfc;"
|2019-06-28
|Win
| align="left" | Ahmet Kilic
|KOK World Series Sakarya
|Sakarya, Turkey
|TKO (Body kick)
|1
|1:16
|-

| colspan=9 | Legend:

See also 
 2021 in K-1
 List of Krush champions
 List of male kickboxers

References

External links 
 Mahmoud Sattari's profile at K-1
 
 
  

1991 births
Living people
People from Karaj
Light heavyweight kickboxers
Cruiserweight kickboxers
Iranian Muay Thai practitioners
Iranian male kickboxers
Japanese male kickboxers
Japanese people of Iranian descent